The Starck AS-57 is a single engine low wing monoplane seating two in side-by-side configuration.  It was designed and built in France just after World War II; only ten were produced, one of which was still active in 2012.

Design and development
Like the earlier Starck A.S. 70 Jac single seat light aircraft, the AS-57 was an all wooden machine. The two types were similar in layout, apart from the accommodation, though the AS-57 was larger all round. The wings were straight tapered in plan, with rounded tips. The earliest AS-57 had full span trailing edge control surfaces which could be lowered as flaps and operated differentially at the same time as ailerons, though one later specimen at least had ailerons outboard and separate flaps inboard. Leading edge slots are fitted. The side-by-side configuration seating is enclosed under a bubble canopy which has transparent access panels. At the rear the canopy line drops to the upper fuselage to improve the pilot's view aft. The fuselage tapers back to the tail unit, where the tailplane is mounted just above the upper fuselage surface, braced from below with a pair of struts and placed well forward of the straight leading edge of the fin. The fin has a curved top which merges into a full, rounded rudder.
 
The AS-57 has a fixed conventional undercarriage; some have had wheel fairings, others not. There is a small tailwheel.  Various engines have been fitted; the one remaining active aircraft has a 78 kW (105 hp) Walter Minor 4-III  but another had a Regnier 67 kW (90 hp) 4E.0, both four cylinder, inverted, air-cooled inlines.

The AS-57 flew for the first time on 4 April 1946.

Operational history
An AS-57 was on view at the 1949 Paris Salon. The general later verdict on the AS-57 was that its appearance was pleasing and its characteristics "honest", but its performance unexceptional.
 
In 2010 only one AS-57, powered by a Walter Minor engine, remained on the French civil aircraft register. Another AS-57 is at the Musée Régional de l'Air at Angers, viewable though not on public  display.

Specifications (Walter Minor engine)

References

1940s French sport aircraft
Low-wing aircraft
Single-engined tractor aircraft
Aircraft first flown in 1946